Alonso Heinze Hauser (born February 15, 1948) is a Mexican sprint canoer who competed in the late 1960s. At the 1968 Summer Olympics in Mexico City, he was eliminated in the repechages of the K-2 1000 m event.

References
Sports-reference.com profile

1948 births
Canoeists at the 1968 Summer Olympics
Living people
Mexican male canoeists
Sportspeople from Mexico City
Olympic canoeists of Mexico
Mexican people of German descent